Shier is a surname. Notable people with the name include:

Jonathan Shier (born 1947), Australian businessman and media executive
Charles C. C. Shier (born 1999), son of Jonathan Shier
Stanley Gerald Umphrey Shier (1903–1968), Canadian physician
Namesake of the Carl H. Shier Farm, a historic building in Dublin, Ohio
David Couper Shier of D.C. Shier & Co Watchmakers and Jewellers in Christchurch, Canterbury, New Zealand (1867-1942)

See also
Shyer (surname)
Shires (surname)